Miloud Homida (born 1976) is an Algerian poet, critic and translator. He was born in Djelfa.

Publications and activities
 Latin pages: impressions of modern Latin literature, the publishing Dar Mime (Assia Ali Mousa).
 Wind of solitude, The Publishing House Linaeditoria, Mexico.
 DACA/ IF; translation of a poem by the Romanian poet Elena Liliana Popescu, with forty other translators, publishing Pelerin, Bucharest.
 Participation in the Spanish-American Anthology, published in Peru and by the poet  Leo Zelada, a member of The House of Poetry in Spain.
 A number of translations of several Spanish poets.

References

External links
 translation from Arabic

1961 births
Algerian literary critics
Algerian male poets
Algerian translators
Living people
Spanish–Arabic translators
Translators to Arabic
People from Djelfa Province
21st-century Algerian people